Pharmacology of estradiol can be divided into:

 Pharmacodynamics of estradiol
 Pharmacokinetics of estradiol

See also
 Pharmacodynamics of progesterone
 Pharmacokinetics of progesterone